Mooar-Wright House (also known as the Defoe-Mooar-Wright House) is a historic house in Pownal, Vermont that is one of the oldest in Vermont. Some believe that the house was built by the Dutch, and others believe that it was built by John Defoe, a British loyalist imprisoned there. The construction date has not yet been verified with dendrochronology.

References

Pownal, Vermont
Houses in Bennington County, Vermont
Houses completed in the 18th century
18th-century establishments in Vermont